Glenn Gwynne (born 22 February 1972) is an Australian former soccer player who played at both professional and international levels as a defender.

Career
Born in Mossman, Gwynne played at club level in Australia for Brisbane United, Parramatta Eagles and Brisbane Strikers.

He also earned two caps for Australia in 1998.

References

1972 births
Living people
Australian soccer players
Australia international soccer players
Brisbane Strikers FC players
Parramatta FC players
1998 OFC Nations Cup players
Association football defenders